Scutiger liupanensis is a species of amphibian in the family Megophryidae. It is endemic to Liupanshan National Nature Reserve in Jingyuan County, Ningxia Hui Autonomous Region, China. Its natural habitats are subtropical or tropical moist montane forests and rivers. It is threatened by habitat loss.

References

liupanensis
Amphibians of China
Endemic fauna of China
Taxonomy articles created by Polbot
Amphibians described in 1985